The labor theory of value (LTV) is a theory of value that argues that the economic value of a good or service is determined by the total amount of "socially necessary labor" required to produce it.

The LTV is usually associated with Marxian economics, although it originally appeared in the theories of earlier classical economists such as Adam Smith and David Ricardo, and later in anarchist economics. Smith saw the price of a commodity in terms of the labor that the purchaser must expend to buy it, which embodies the concept of how much labor a commodity, a tool for example, can save the purchaser. The LTV is central to Marxist theory, which holds that the working class is exploited under capitalism, and dissociates price and value. However, Marx did not refer to his own theory of value as a "labour theory of value".

Orthodox neoclassical economics rejects the LTV, using a theory of value based on subjective preferences.

The revival in interpretation of Marx known as the  also rejects Marxian economics and the LTV, calling them "substantialist". This reading claims that the LTV is a misinterpretation of the concept of fetishism in relation to value, and that this understanding never appears in Marx's work. The school heavily emphasizes works such as Capital as explicitly being a critique of political economy, instead of a "more correct" theory.

Definitions of value and labor 
When speaking in terms of a labor theory of value, "value", without any qualifying adjective should theoretically refer to the amount of labor necessary to produce a marketable commodity, including the labor necessary to develop any real capital used in the production. Both David Ricardo and Karl Marx tried to quantify and embody all labor components in order to develop a theory of the real price, or natural price of a commodity. The labor theory of value as presented by Adam Smith did not require the quantification of past labor, nor did it deal with the labor needed to create the tools (capital) that might be used in producing a commodity. Smith's theory of value was very similar to the later utility theories in that Smith proclaimed that a commodity was worth whatever labor it would command in others (value in trade) or whatever labor it would "save" the self (value in use), or both. However, this "value" is subject to supply and demand at a particular time: The real price of every thing, what every thing really costs to the man who wants to acquire it, is the toil and trouble of acquiring it. What every thing is really worth to the man who has acquired it, and who wants to dispose of it or exchange it for something else, is the toil and trouble which it can save to himself, and which it can impose upon other people. (Wealth of Nations Book 1, chapter V)

Smith's theory of price has nothing to do with the past labor spent in producing a commodity.  It speaks only of the labor that can be "commanded" or "saved" at present.  If there is no use for a buggy whip, then the item is economically worthless in trade or in use, regardless of all the labor spent in creating it.

Distinctions of economically pertinent labor 
Value "in use" is the usefulness of this commodity, its utility. A classical paradox often comes up when considering this type of value. In the words of Adam Smith: The word value, it is to be observed, has two different meanings, and sometimes expresses the utility of some particular object, and sometimes the power of purchasing other goods which the possession of that object conveys. The one may be called "value in use"; the other, "value in exchange." The things which have the greatest value in use have frequently little or no value in exchange; and, on the contrary, those which have the greatest value in exchange have frequently little or no value in use. Nothing is more useful than water: but it will purchase scarce anything; scarce anything can be had in exchange for it. A diamond, on the contrary, has scarce any value in use; but a very great quantity of other goods may frequently be had in exchange for it (Wealth of Nations Book 1, chapter IV).

Value "in exchange" is the relative proportion with which this commodity exchanges for another commodity (in other words, its price in the case of money). It is relative to labor as explained by Adam Smith: The value of any commodity, [...] to the person who possesses it, and who means not to use or consume it himself, but to exchange it for other commodities, is equal to the quantity of labour which it enables him to purchase or command. Labour, therefore, is the real measure of the exchangeable value of all commodities (Wealth of Nations Book 1, chapter V).

Value (without qualification) is the labor embodied in a commodity under a given structure of production. Marx defined the value of the commodity by this third definition. In his terms, value is the 'socially necessary abstract labor' embodied in a commodity. To David Ricardo and other classical economists, this definition serves as a measure of "real cost", "absolute value", or a "measure of value" invariable under changes in distribution and technology.

Ricardo, other classical economists and Marx began their expositions with the assumption that value in exchange was equal to or proportional to this labor value. They thought this was a good assumption from which to explore the dynamics of development in capitalist societies. Other supporters of the labor theory of value used the word "value" in the second sense to represent "exchange value".

Labor process 
Since the term "value" is understood in the LTV as denoting something created by labor, and its "magnitude" as something proportional to the quantity of labor performed, it is important to explain how the labor process both preserves value and adds new value in the commodities it creates.

The value of a commodity increases in proportion to the duration and intensity of labor performed on average for its production. Part of what the LTV means by "socially necessary" is that the value only increases in proportion to this labor as it is performed with average skill and average productivity. So though workers may labor with greater skill or more productivity than others, these more skillful and more productive workers thus produce more value through the production of greater quantities of the finished commodity. Each unit still bears the same value as all the others of the same class of commodity. By working sloppily, unskilled workers may drag down the average skill of labor, thus increasing the average labor time necessary for the production of each unit commodity. But these unskillful workers cannot hope to sell the result of their labor process at a higher price (as opposed to value) simply because they have spent more time than other workers producing the same kind of commodities.

However, production not only involves labor, but also certain means of labor: tools, materials, power plants and so on. These means of labor—also known as means of production—are often the product of another labor process as well. So the labor process inevitably involves these means of production that already enter the process with a certain amount of value. Labor also requires other means of production that are not produced with labor and therefore bear no value: such as sunlight, air, uncultivated land, unextracted minerals, etc. While useful, even crucial to the production process, these bring no value to that process. In terms of means of production resulting from another labor process, LTV treats the magnitude of value of these produced means of production as constant throughout the labor process. Due to the constancy of their value, these means of production are referred to, in this light, as constant capital.

Consider for example workers who take coffee beans, use a roaster to roast them, and then use a brewer to brew and dispense a fresh cup of coffee. In performing this labor, these workers add value to the coffee beans and water that comprise the material ingredients of a cup of coffee. The worker also transfers the value of constant capital—the value of the beans; some specific depreciated value of the roaster and the brewer; and the value of the cup—to the value of the final cup of coffee. Again, on average, the worker can transfer no more than the value of these means of labor previously possessed to the finished cup of coffee. So the value of coffee produced in a day equals the sum of both the value of the means of labor—this constant capital—and the value newly added by the worker in proportion to the duration and intensity of their work.

Often this is expressed mathematically as:

where
  is the constant capital of materials used in a period plus the depreciated portion of tools and plant used in the process. (A period is typically a day, week, year, or a single turnover: meaning the time required to complete one batch of coffee, for example.)
  is the quantity of labor time (average skill and productivity) performed in producing the finished commodities during the period
  is the value (or think "worth") of the product of the period ( comes from the German word for value: wert)
Note: if the product resulting from the labor process is homogeneous (all similar in quality and traits, for example, all cups of coffee) then the value of the period's product can be divided by the total number of items (use-values or ) produced to derive the unit value of each item.  where  is the total items produced.

The LTV further divides the value added during the period of production, into two parts. The first part is the portion of the process when the workers add value equivalent to the wages they are paid. For example, if the period in question is one week and these workers collectively are paid $1,000, then the time necessary to add $1,000 to—while preserving the value of—constant capital is considered the necessary labor portion of the period (or week): denoted . The value used to purchase labor-power, for example, the $1,000 paid in wages to these workers for the week, is called variable capital. This is because in contrast to the constant capital expended on means of production, variable capital can add value in the labor process. The amount it adds depends on the duration, intensity, productivity and skill of the labor-power purchased: in this sense, the buyer of labor-power has purchased a commodity of variable use. Finally, the value added during the portion of the period when surplus labor is performed is called surplus value. From the variables defined above, we find two other common expressions for the value produced during a given period:

and

The first form of the equation expresses the value resulting from production, focusing on the costs  and the surplus value appropriated in the process of production, . The second form of the equation focuses on the value of production in terms of the values added by the labor performed during the process .

Relation between values and prices 
One issue facing the LTV is the relationship between value quantities on one hand and prices on the other. If a commodity's value is not the same as its price, and therefore the magnitudes of each likely differ, then what is the relation between the two, if any? Various LTV schools of thought provide different answers to this question. For example, some argue that value in the sense of the amount of labor embodied in a good acts as a center of gravity for price.

However, most economists would say that cases where pricing is given as approximately equal to the value of the labour embodied, are in fact only special cases.  In General Theory pricing most usually fluctuates.  The standard formulation is that prices normally include a level of income for "capital" and "land".  These incomes are known as "profit" and "rent" respectively. Yet Marx made the point that value cannot be placed upon labour as a commodity, because capital is a constant, whereas profit is a variable, not an income; thus explaining the importance of profit in relation to pricing variables.

In Book 1, chapter VI, Adam Smith writes:
The real value of all the different component parts of price, it must be observed, is measured by the quantity of labour which they can, each of them, purchase or command. Labour measures the value not only of that part of price which resolves itself into labour, but of that which resolves itself into rent, and of that which resolves itself into profit.

The final sentence explains how Smith sees value of a product as relative to labor of buyer or consumer, as opposite to Marx who sees the value of a product being proportional to labor of laborer or producer. And we value things, price them, based on how much labor we can avoid or command, and we can command labor not only in a simple way but also by trading things for a profit.

The demonstration of the relation between commodities' unit values and their respective prices is known in Marxian terminology as the transformation problem or the transformation of values into prices of production. The transformation problem has probably generated the greatest bulk of debate about the LTV. The problem with transformation is to find an algorithm where the magnitude of value added by labor, in proportion to its duration and intensity, is sufficiently accounted for after this value is distributed through prices that reflect an equal rate of return on capital advanced. If there is an additional magnitude of value or a loss of value after transformation, then the relation between values (proportional to labor) and prices (proportional to total capital advanced) is incomplete. Various solutions and impossibility theorems have been offered for the transformation, but the debate has not reached any clear resolution.

LTV does not deny the role of supply and demand influencing price, since the price of a commodity is something other than its value.  In Value, Price and Profit (1865), Karl Marx quotes Adam Smith and sums up:
It suffices to say that if supply and demand equilibrate each other, the market prices of commodities will correspond with their natural prices, that is to say, with their values as determined by the respective quantities of labor required for their production.

The LTV seeks to explain the level of this equilibrium. This could be explained by a cost of production argument—pointing out that all costs are ultimately labor costs, but this does not account for profit, and it is vulnerable to the charge of tautology in that it explains prices by prices. Marx later called this "Smith's adding up theory of value".

Smith argues that labor values are the natural measure of exchange for direct producers like hunters and fishermen. Marx, on the other hand, uses a measurement analogy, arguing that for commodities to be comparable they must have a common element or substance by which to measure them, and that labor is a common substance of what Marx eventually calls commodity-values.

History

Origins 
The labor theory of value has developed over many centuries. It had no single originator, but rather many different thinkers arrived at the same conclusion independently. Aristotle is claimed to hold to this view.  Some writers trace its origin to Thomas Aquinas. In his Summa Theologiae (1265–1274) he expresses the view that "value can, does and should increase in relation to the amount of labor which has been expended in the improvement of commodities." Scholars such as Joseph Schumpeter have cited Ibn Khaldun, who in his Muqaddimah (1377), described labor as the source of value, necessary for all earnings and capital accumulation. He argued that even if earning "results from something other than a craft, the value of the resulting profit and acquired (capital) must (also) include the value of the labor by which it was obtained. Without labor, it would not have been acquired." Scholars have also pointed to Sir William Petty's Treatise of Taxes of 1662 and to John Locke's labor theory of property, set out in the Second Treatise on Government (1689), which sees labor as the ultimate source of economic value. Karl Marx himself credited Benjamin Franklin in his 1729 essay entitled "A Modest Enquiry into the Nature and Necessity of a Paper Currency" as being "one of the first" to advance the theory.

Adam Smith accepted the theory for pre-capitalist societies but saw a flaw in its application to contemporary capitalism. He pointed out that if the "labor embodied" in a product equaled the "labor commanded" (i.e. the amount of labor that could be purchased by selling it), then profit was impossible. David Ricardo (seconded by Marx) responded to this paradox by arguing that Smith had confused labor with wages. "Labor commanded", he argued, would always be more than the labor needed to sustain itself (wages). The value of labor, in this view, covered not just the value of wages (what Marx called the value of labor power), but the value of the entire product created by labor.

Ricardo's theory was a predecessor of the modern theory that equilibrium prices are determined solely by production costs associated with Neo-Ricardianism.

Based on the discrepancy between the wages of labor and the value of the product, the "Ricardian socialists"—Charles Hall, Thomas Hodgskin, John Gray, and John Francis Bray, and Percy Ravenstone—applied Ricardo's theory to develop theories of exploitation.

Marx expanded on these ideas, arguing that workers work for a part of each day adding the value required to cover their wages, while the remainder of their labor is performed for the enrichment of the capitalist. The LTV and the accompanying theory of exploitation became central to his economic thought.

19th century American individualist anarchists based their economics on the LTV, with their particular interpretation of it being called "Cost the limit of price". They, as well as contemporary individualist anarchists in that tradition, hold that it is unethical to charge a higher price for a commodity than the amount of labor required to produce it. Hence, they propose that trade should be facilitated by using notes backed by labor.

Adam Smith and David Ricardo 
Adam Smith held that, in a primitive society, the amount of labor put into producing a good determined its exchange value, with exchange value meaning, in this case, the amount of labor a good can purchase. However, according to Smith, in a more advanced society the market price is no longer proportional to labor cost since the value of the good now includes compensation for the owner of the means of production: "The whole produce of labour does not always belong to the labourer. He must in most cases share it with the owner of the stock which employs him." According to Whitaker, Smith is claiming that the 'real value' of such a commodity produced in advanced society is measured by the labor which that commodity will command in exchange but "[Smith] disowns what is naturally thought of as the genuine classical labor theory of value, that labor-cost regulates market-value. This theory was Ricardo's, and really his alone."

Classical economist David Ricardo's labor theory of value holds that the value of a good (how much of another good or service it exchanges for in the market) is proportional to how much labor was required to produce it, including the labor required to produce the raw materials and machinery used in the process. David Ricardo stated it as, "The value of a commodity, or the quantity of any other commodity for which it will exchange, depends on the relative quantity of labour which is necessary for its production, and not on the greater or less compensation which is paid for that labour." In this connection Ricardo seeks to differentiate the quantity of labour necessary to produce a commodity from the wages paid to the laborers for its production.  Therefore, wages did not always increase with the price of a commodity. However, Ricardo was troubled with some deviations in prices from proportionality with the labor required to produce them.  For example, he said "I cannot get over the difficulty of the wine, which is kept in the cellar for three or four years [i.e., while constantly increasing in exchange value], or that of the oak tree, which perhaps originally had not 2 s. expended on it in the way of labour, and yet comes to be worth £100." (Quoted in Whitaker) Of course, a capitalist economy stabilizes this discrepancy until the value added to aged wine is equal to the cost of storage. If anyone can hold onto a bottle for four years and become rich, that would make it hard to find freshly corked wine. There is also the theory that adding to the price of a luxury product increases its exchange-value by mere prestige.

The labor theory as an explanation for value contrasts with the subjective theory of value, which says that value of a good is not determined by how much labor was put into it but by its usefulness in satisfying a want and its scarcity. Ricardo's labor theory of value is not a normative theory, as are some later forms of the labor theory, such as claims that it is immoral for an individual to be paid less for his labor than the total revenue that comes from the sales of all the goods he produces.

It is arguable to what extent these classical theorists held the labor theory of value as it is commonly defined. For instance, David Ricardo theorized that prices are determined by the amount of labor but found exceptions for which the labor theory could not account. In a letter, he wrote: "I am not satisfied with the explanation I have given of the principles which regulate value." Adam Smith theorized that the labor theory of value holds true only in the "early and rude state of society" but not in a modern economy where owners of capital are compensated by profit. As a result, "Smith ends up making little use of a labor theory of value."

Anarchism 

Pierre Joseph Proudhon's mutualism and American individualist anarchists such as Josiah Warren, Lysander Spooner and Benjamin Tucker adopted the labor theory of value of classical economics and used it to criticize capitalism while favoring a non-capitalist market system.

Warren is widely regarded as the first American anarchist, and the four-page weekly paper he edited during 1833, The Peaceful Revolutionist, was the first anarchist periodical published. Cost the limit of price was a maxim coined by Warren, indicating a (prescriptive) version of the labor theory of value. Warren maintained that the just compensation for labor (or for its product) could only be an equivalent amount of labor (or a product embodying an equivalent amount). Thus, profit, rent, and interest were considered unjust economic arrangements. In keeping with the tradition of Adam Smith's The Wealth of Nations, the "cost" of labor is considered to be the subjective cost; i.e., the amount of suffering involved in it. He put his theories to the test by establishing an experimental "labor for labor store" called the Cincinnati Time Store at the corner of 5th and Elm Streets in what is now downtown Cincinnati, where trade was facilitated by notes backed by a promise to perform labor. "All the goods offered for sale in Warren's store were offered at the same price the merchant himself had paid for them, plus a small surcharge, in the neighborhood of 4 to 7 percent, to cover store overhead." The store stayed open for three years; after it closed, Warren could pursue establishing colonies based on Mutualism. These included "Utopia" and "Modern Times". Warren said that Stephen Pearl Andrews' The Science of Society, published in 1852, was the most lucid and complete exposition of Warren's own theories.

Mutualism is an economic theory and anarchist school of thought that advocates a society where each person might possess a means of production, either individually or collectively, with trade representing equivalent amounts of labor in the free market. Integral to the scheme was the establishment of a mutual-credit bank that would lend to producers at a minimal interest rate, just high enough to cover administration. Mutualism is based on a labor theory of value that holds that when labor or its product is sold, in exchange, it ought to receive goods or services embodying "the amount of labor necessary to produce an article of exactly similar and equal utility". Mutualism originated from the writings of philosopher Pierre-Joseph Proudhon.

Collectivist anarchism as defended by Mikhail Bakunin defended a form of labor theory of value when it advocated a system where "all necessaries for production are owned in common by the labour groups and the free communes ... based on the distribution of goods according to the labour contributed".

Karl Marx 
Contrary to popular belief Marx never used the term "Labor theory of value" in any of his works but used the term Law of value, Marx opposed "ascribing a supernatural creative power to labor", arguing as such:
Labor is not the source of all wealth. Nature is just as much a source of use values (and it is surely of such that material wealth consists!) as labor, which is itself only the manifestation of a force of nature, human labor power.

Here, Marx was distinguishing between exchange value (the subject of the LTV) and use value. Marx used the concept of "socially necessary labor time" to introduce a social perspective distinct from his predecessors and neoclassical economics.  Whereas most economists start with the individual's perspective, Marx started with the perspective of society as a whole. "Social production" involves a complicated and interconnected division of labor of a wide variety of people who depend on each other for their survival and prosperity. "Abstract" labor refers to a characteristic of commodity-producing labor that is shared by all different kinds of heterogeneous (concrete) types of labor. That is, the concept abstracts from the particular characteristics of all of the labor and is akin to average labor.

"Socially necessary" labor refers to the quantity required to produce a commodity "in a given state of society, under certain social average conditions or production, with a given social average intensity, and average skill of the labor employed." That is, the value of a product is determined more by societal standards than by individual conditions. This explains why technological breakthroughs lower the price of commodities and put less advanced producers out of business. Finally, it is not labor per se that creates value, but labor power sold by free wage workers to capitalists. Another distinction is between productive and unproductive labor. Only wage workers of productive sectors of the economy produce value. According to Marx an increase in productiveness of the laborer does not affect the value of a commodity, but rather, increases the surplus value realized by the capitalist. Therefore, decreasing the cost of production does not decrease the value of a commodity, but allows the capitalist to produce more and increases the opportunity to earn a greater profit or surplus value, as long as there is demand for the additional units of production.

Criticism 

The Marxist labor theory of value has been criticised on several counts. Some argue that it predicts that profits will be higher in labor-intensive industries than in capital-intensive industries, which would be contradicted by measured empirical data inherent in quantitative analysis. This is sometimes referred to as the "Great Contradiction". In volume 3 of Capital, Marx explains why profits are not distributed according to which industries are the most labor-intensive and why this is consistent with his theory. Whether or not this is consistent with the labor theory of value as presented in volume 1 has been a topic of debate. According to Marx, surplus value is extracted by the capitalist class as a whole and then distributed according to the amount of total capital, not just the variable component. In the example given earlier, of making a cup of coffee, the constant capital involved in production is the coffee beans themselves, and the variable capital is the value added by the coffee maker. The value added by the coffee maker is dependent on its technological capabilities, and the coffee maker can only add so much total value to cups of coffee over its lifespan. The amount of value added to the product is thus the amortization of the value of the coffeemaker. We can also note that not all products have equal proportions of value added by amortized capital. Capital intensive industries such as finance may have a large contribution of capital, while labor-intensive industries like traditional agriculture would have a relatively small one. Critics argue that this turns the LTV into a macroeconomic theory, when it was supposed to explain the exchange ratios of individual commodities in terms of their relation to their labour ratios (making it a microeconomic theory), yet Marx was now maintaining that these ratios must diverge from their labour ratios. Critics thus held that Marx's proposed solution to the "great contradiction" was not so much a solution as it was sidestepping the issue.

Steve Keen argues that Marx's idea that only labor can produce value rests on the idea that as capital depreciates over its use, then this is transferring its exchange-value to the product. Keen argues that it is not clear why the value of the machine should depreciate at the same rate it is lost. Keen uses an analogy with labor: If workers receive a subsistence wage and the working day exhausts the capacity to labor, it could be argued that the worker has "depreciated" by the amount equivalent to the subsistence wage. However this depreciation is not the limit of value a worker can add in a day (indeed this is critical to Marx's idea that labor is fundamentally exploited). If it were, then the production of a surplus would be impossible. According to Keen, a machine could have a use-value greater than its exchange-value, meaning it could, along with labor, be a source of surplus. Keen claims that Marx almost reached such a conclusion in the Grundrisse but never developed it any further. Keen further observes that while Marx insisted that the contribution of machines to production is solely their use-value and not their exchange-value, he routinely treated the use-value and exchange-value of a machine as identical, despite the fact that this would contradict his claim that the two were unrelated. Marxists respond by arguing that use-value and exchange-value are incommensurable magnitudes; to claim that a machine can add "more use-value" than it is worth in value-terms is a category error. According to Marx, a machine by definition cannot be a source of human labor. Keen responds by arguing that the labor theory of value only works if the use-value and exchange-value of a machine are identical, as Marx argued that machines cannot create surplus value since as their use-value depreciates along with their exchange-value; they simply transfer it to the new product but create no new value in the process. Keen's machinery argument can also be applied to slavery based modes of production, which also profit from extracting more use value from the laborers than they return to laborers.

In their work Capital as Power, Shimshon Bichler and Jonathan Nitzan argue that while Marxists have claimed to produce empirical evidence of the labor theory of value via numerous studies which show consistent correlations between values and prices, these studies do not actually provide evidence for it and are inadequate. According to the authors, these studies attempt to prove the LTV by showing that there is a positive correlation between market prices and labor values. However, the authors argue that these studies measure prices by looking at the price of total output (the unit price of a commodity multiplied by its total quantity) and do these for several sectors of the economy, estimate their total price and value from official statistics and measured for several years. However, Bichler and Nitzan argue that this method has statistical implications as correlations measured this way also reflect the co-variations of the associated quantities of unit values and prices. This means that the unit price and unit value of each sector are multiplied by the same value, which means that the greater the variability of output across different sectors, the tighter the correlation. This means that the overall correlation is substantially larger than the underlying correlation between unit values and unit prices; when sectors are controlled for their size, the correlations often drop to insignificant levels. Furthermore, the authors argue that the studies do not seem to actually attempt to measure the correlation between value and price. The authors argue that, according to Marx, the value of a commodity indicates the abstract labor time required for its production; however Marxists have been unable to identify a way to measure a unit (elementary particle) of abstract labor (indeed the authors argue that most have given up and little progress has been made beyond Marx's original work) due to numerous difficulties. This means assumptions must be made and according to the authors, these involve circular reasoning:

Bichler and Nitzan argue that this amounts to converting prices into values and then determining if they correlate, which the authors argue proves nothing since the studies are simply correlating prices with themselves. Paul Cockshott disagreed with Bichler and Nitzan's arguments, arguing that it was possible to measure abstract labour time using wage bills and data on working hours, while also arguing Bichler and Nitzan's claims that the true value-price correlations should be much lower actually relied on poor statistical analysis itself. Most Marxists, however, reject Bichler and Nitzan's interpretation of Marx, arguing that their assertion that individual commodities can have values, rather than prices of production, misunderstands Marx's work. For example, Fred Moseley argues Marx understood "value" to be a "macro-monetary" variable (the total amount of labor added in a given year plus the depreciation of fixed capital in that year), which is then concretized at the level of individual prices of production, meaning that "individual values" of commodities do not exist.

The theory can also be sometimes found in non-Marxist traditions. For instance, mutualist theorist Kevin Carson's Studies in Mutualist Political Economy opens with an attempt to integrate marginalist critiques into the labor theory of value.

Some post-Keynesian economists have been highly critical of the labor theory of value. Joan Robinson, who herself was considered an expert on the writings of Karl Marx, wrote that the labor theory of value was largely a tautology and "a typical example of the way metaphysical ideas operate". The well-known Marxian economist Roman Rosdolsky replied to Robinson's claims at length, arguing that Robinson failed to understand key components of Marx's theory; for instance, Robinson argued that "Marx's theory, as we have seen, rests on the assumption of a constant rate of exploitation", but as Rosdolsky points out, there is a great deal of contrary evidence.

In ecological economics, the labor theory of value has been criticized, where it is argued that labor is in fact energy over time. Such arguments generally fail to recognize that Marx is inquiring into social relations among human beings, which cannot be reduced to the expenditure of energy, just as democracy cannot be reduced to the expenditure of energy that a voter makes in getting to the polling place. However, echoing Joan Robinson, Alf Hornborg, an environmental historian, argues that both the reliance on "energy theory of value" and "labor theory of value" are problematic as they propose that use-values (or material wealth) are more "real" than exchange-values (or cultural wealth)—yet, use-values are culturally determined. For Hornborg, any Marxist argument that claims uneven wealth is due to the "exploitation" or "underpayment" of use-values is actually a tautological contradiction, since it must necessarily quantify "underpayment" in terms of exchange-value. The alternative would be to conceptualize unequal exchange as "an asymmetric net transfer of material inputs in production (e.g., embodied labor, energy, land, and water), rather than in terms of an underpayment of material inputs or an asymmetric transfer of 'value'". In other words, uneven exchange is characterised by incommensurability, namely: the unequal transfer of material inputs; competing value-judgements of the worth of labor, fuel, and raw materials; differing availability of industrial technologies; and the off-loading of environmental burdens on those with less resources.

See also

 Abstract labor and concrete labor
 Cost the limit of price
 Division of labor
 Labor notes (currency)
 Law of value
 Prices of production
 Producerism
 Productive and unproductive labor
 Social division of labor
 Surplus labor
 Surplus product
 Surplus value
 Transformation problem
 Value-form
 Anarchy of Production

Competing theories
 Anarcho-communism
 Entitlement theory
 Marginalism
 Neo-Ricardianism
 Subjective theory of value

Notes

References

Further reading 
 Bhaduri, Amit. 1969. "On the Significance of Recent Controversies on Capital Theory: A Marxian View." Economic Journal. 79(315) September: 532–539.
 von Böhm-Bawerk, Eugen Karl Marx and the Close of His System (Classic criticism of Marxist economic theory).
 G.A. Cohen 'The Labour Theory of Value and the Concept of Exploitation', in his History Labour and Freedom.
 Duncan, Colin A.M. 1996. The Centrality of Agriculture: Between Humankind and The Rest of Nature. McGill–Queen's University Press, Montreal.
 ——2000. The Centrality of Agriculture: History, Ecology and Feasible Socialism. Socialist Register, pp. 187–205.
 ——2004. Adam Smith's green vision and the future of global socialism. In Albritton, R; Shannon Bell; John R. Bell; and R. Westra [Eds.] New Socialisms: Futures Beyond Globalization. New York/London, Routledge. pp. 90–104.
 
 Eldred, Michael (1984). Critique of Competitive Freedom and the Bourgeois-Democratic State: Outline of a Form-analytic Extension of Marx's Uncompleted System. With an Appendix 'Value-form Analytic Reconstruction of the Capital-Analysis' by Michael Eldred, Marnie Hanlon, Lucia Kleiber and Mike Roth, Kurasje, Copenhagen. Emended, digitized edition 2010 with a new Preface, lxxiii + 466 pp. .
 Ellerman, David P. (1992) Property & Contract in Economics: The Case for Economic Democracy. Blackwell. Chapters 4,5, and 13 critiques of LTV in favor of the labor theory of property.
 Engels, F. (1880). Socialism: Utopian and Scientific.
 Freeman, Alan: Price, value and profit – a continuous, general treatment. In: Alan Freeman, Guglielmo Carchedi (editors): Marx and Non-equilibrium Economics. Edward Elgar Publishing. Cheltenham, UK, Brookfield, US 1996. .
 Hagendorf, Klaus: The Labour Theory of Value. A Historical-Logical Analysis. Paris: EURODOS; 2008.
 Hagendorf, Klaus: Labour Values and the Theory of the Firm. Part I: The Competitive Firm. Paris: EURODOS; 2009.
 Hansen, Bue Rübner. (2011). "Review of Capital as Power by Jonathan Nitzan and Shimson Bichler". Historical Materialism 19, no. 2: 144–159.
 Henderson, James M.; Quandt, Richard E. 1971: Microeconomic Theory – A Mathematical Approach. Second Edition/International Student Edition. McGraw-Hill Kogakusha, Ltd.
 Keen, Steven Use, Value, and Exchange: The Misinterpretation of Marx.
 
  ([Internet edition: 1999] [1887 English edition]).
 
 Moseley, Fred. (2016). Money and Totality Leiden, Netherlands: Brill.
 Murray, Patrick. (2016). The Mismeasure of Wealth : Essays on Marx and Social Form Leiden, Netherlands: Brill.
 Ormazabal, Kepa M. (2004). Smith On Labour Value Bilbo, Biscay, Spain: University of the Basque Country Working Paper.
 Parrington, Vernon Louis. The Autobiography of Benjamin Franklin.
 Pokrovskii, Vladimir (2011). Econodynamics. The Theory of Social Production. Springer, Dordrecht-Heidelberg-London-New York.
 Rubin, Isaak Illich (1928). Essays on Marx's Theory of Value
 Shaikh, Anwar (1998). "The Empirical Strength of the Labour Theory of Value" in Conference Proceedings of Marxian Economics: A Centenary Appraisal, Riccardo Bellofiore (ed.), Macmillan, London.
 
 Vianello, F. (1987). "Labour theory of value", in: Eatwell, J. and Milgate, M. and Newman, P. (eds.): The New Palgrave: A Dictionary of Economics, Macmillan e Stockton, London e New York, .
 Wolff, Jonathan (2003). " Karl Marx in Stanford Encyclopedia of Philosophy.
 

Labour economics
Marxian economics
Classical economics
Theory of value (economics)
Thomas Aquinas